Kari Kaaja (born 6 April 1941) is a Finnish modern pentathlete. He competed at the 1964 Summer Olympics.

References

External links
 

1941 births
Living people
Finnish male modern pentathletes
Olympic modern pentathletes of Finland
Modern pentathletes at the 1964 Summer Olympics
Sportspeople from Helsinki